Benoit Buratti  (born 10 November 1997) is a French freestyle skier.

He competed in the 2017 FIS Freestyle World Ski Championships, and represented France at the 2018 Winter Olympics in PyeongChang.

References

External links 
 

1997 births
Living people
French male freestyle skiers
Olympic freestyle skiers of France
Freestyle skiers at the 2018 Winter Olympics